The Day of Books and Roses, April 23, is celebrated in Catalonia, Spain. This day is also known as La Diada de Sant Jordi in Catalan. On this day love and literature are celebrated throughout Catalonia. Books and roses are exchanged.

Contemporary Celebration 
April 23 is one of the most important days in Catalan culture when people exchange books and roses. Preparations for the Day of Books and Roses begins well before April 23. In Barcelona, the city is papered with posters in all neighborhoods, and the central activity is in the Ramblas, the Passeig de Gràcia, and Rambla Catalonia. Tents are setup on the sidewalks for the sale of books and red roses. Bookstores bring their materials outside, and various associations, unions, and schools line the streets at tables. Also, there are small tables of illustrators and authors selling and signing their books. Even though there is considerable activity in the streets, bookstores are also crowded on this day with lines extending outside.

Since 1997 the official slogan of the day has been, "A rose for a love, and a book forever." 

Schools in Catalonia prepare for the day with numerous activities related to books and literature.

The day generates considerable economic activity for authors, publishers, and booksellers. For example, in Catalonia on April 23, 2016 more than 1,580,000 copies of 45,267 book titles were sold and 54% of these were in the Catalan language. Annually, approximately 8% of books sold in Catalonia are sold on this day, 1.5 million books, and a third of all roses.

In 2015, the Barcelona-based Diplocat Consortium (Catalan government) launched an effort to internationalize the Day of Books and Roses. The campaign uses the hashtag #BooksAndRoses to bring attention to events, activities, and celebrations outside of Catalonia.

History of the Day of Books and Roses

Day of the Book 
In 1923, Vicente Clavel, a Valencian writer, editor, and the director of the publishing house Cervantes in Barcelona first proposed Book Day. A decision was not made and the proposal languished, but, again in 1925 he approached the idea with the Catalan Chamber of Books, of which he was Vice President, and finally in February of 1926 a decision was made to create and promote a day dedicated to books on October 7. October 7 is believed by some people to be the birth date of the writer Cervantes. Clavel and the Chamber of Books also lobbied for Day of the Book at a national level and as a result, in the same year, King Alfonso XIII of Spain signed a decree designating October 7 as Book Day. The day after the second annual Book Day, on October 8, 1927, the Barcelona newspaper, La Vanguardia published, "Barcelona celebrated Book Day with real fervor yesterday. A festival of civility and intelligence, it has quickly taken root in the soul of the city. From last year - when it was held for the first time - to this year, the progress is extraordinary" (translated).

Day of the Rose and Sant Jordi's legend 

Before 1931, April 23 was known as the Day of the Rose or Sant Jordi's Day in Catalonia (Saint George or San Jorge in other regions of Spain and Europe).  

The story begins with real events on April 23, 303 AD, when Romans beheaded a soldier named George, probably in Greece. The story of this knight then developed into a legend over hundreds of years. In Catalonia the legend involved Sant Jordi killing a dragon and saving a princess. When Jordi slayed the dragon, a rose bush grew from the blood of the dragon, and the knight presented one of these roses to the princess. According to legend, a rose bush grows there every April.

The legend of Sant Jordi spread throughout the Catalan region until, in 1456, Sant Jordi was named the Patron Saint of Catalonia and the annual commemoration with roses began. It is interesting to note that the first Catalan printed book was published in 1474.

In the early 1700s, with the fall of the city of Barcelona and the ascension of the Bourbons to the Spanish throne, Sant Jordi's day began to fall out of favor. It was not until the end of the 1800s, with the Renaixença, that Sant Jordi’s day regained its previous popularity within Catalonia.

The merging of important days and traditions into one holiday featuring books and roses 

In 1931, five years after the establishment of the Day of the Book, the event was moved from October 7 to April 23 at the request of booksellers to coincide with the day that Cervantes and Shakespeare died. The day quickly grew in popularity because it also coincided with St. Jordi's day and the Rose Festival which had been celebrated for hundreds of years.

Although the Day of Books and Roses quickly grew in popularity, under the Spanish dictatorship of Francisco Franco, from 1936 to 1975,  Catalan language and culture was repressed, and Sant Jordi celebrations were prohibited

In 1995, UNESCO adopted April 23 as "International Book Day" and decreed the book as the most important instrument in the dissemination of knowledge. in 2015 Barcelona was named as an UNESCO City of Literature, central to the candidacy was the unique celebration of books and roses.  In 2017 a group of Catalan publishers, booksellers, florists, and other professionals presented an application to UNESCO to have the Day of Books and Roses recognized as Intangible Heritage.

References

External links 
Books and Roses
Short video about the day.

Catalan folklore
Catalan culture
Books
Holidays
Saint George's Day
April observances